The year 1856 in architecture involved some significant architectural events and new buildings.

Buildings and structures

Buildings opened

 February – State Library of Victoria in Melbourne, Australia, designed by Joseph Reed
 May 15 – Rumeli Feneri, Istanbul, Turkey
 August 31 – The Esztergom Basilica in Hungary, designed by Pál Kühnel and József Hild (consecrated)
 October 4 – Lindau Lighthouse, Bavaria
 November 1 – Stamford Water Street railway station in Lincolnshire, England, designed by William Hurst

Buildings completed
 Debating chambers of Parliament House, Melbourne, Australia, designed by General Charles Pasley
 Dolmabahçe Palace in Istanbul, Turkey.
 Landherrnamt, Bremen, Germany, designed by Alexander Schröder in the Neo-Romanesque style
 Walnut Hall, Toronto, Canada, designed by John Tully as O'Donohoe Row (demolished 2007)

Events
 Future English novelist and poet Thomas Hardy is apprenticed to architect James Hicks in Dorchester, Dorset.

Awards
 RIBA Royal Gold Medal – William Tite.
 Grand Prix de Rome, architecture: Edmond Guillaume.

Births
 January 7 – Sydney Mitchell, Scottish architect (died 1930)
 January 21 – Gustaf Nyström, Finnish architect (died 1917)
 February 12 – Hendrik Petrus Berlage, Dutch architect (died 1934)
 August 5 – Axel Berg, Danish architect (died 1929)
 September 3 – Louis Sullivan, American architect, "father of skyscrapers" (died 1924)
 September 23 – John Bilson, English architect and architectural historian (died 1943)
 October 30 – Edward Prioleau Warren, English architect (died 1937)
 December 20 – Reginald Blomfield, English architect (died 1942)
 date unknown – Eugène Vallin, French architect, furniture designer and manufacturer (died 1922)

Deaths

 March 20 – Robert Reid, King's architect and surveyor for Scotland from 1827 to 1839 (born 1774)
 March 27 – David Laing, British architect (born 1774)

References

Architecture
Years in architecture
19th-century architecture